Louis Dumont may refer to:

 Louis Dumont (1911–1998), French anthropologist
 Louis Dumont (ice hockey) (born 1973), Canadian ice hockey player
 Pierre Étienne Louis Dumont (1759–1829), French political writer